Władysław Puślecki (born 11 May 1933 in Bartoszewice, Poland, died 8 December 2008 in Opole, Poland)  – was a Polish pedagogist, professor of Humanities, specialist in the field of general and alternative didactic methods, propagator of student subjectivity (Polish: „pełnomocność ucznia”), researcher of school of the future, educator of few teachers generations.

References

1933 births
2008 deaths
Academic staff of the University of Opole
Recipient of the Meritorious Activist of Culture badge